Maria Rickenbach Monastery is a Benedictine monastery of Religious Sisters. It is situated in the village of Niederrickenbach in the municipality of Oberdorf in the Swiss canton of Nidwalden.  It is accessible to the public only by cable car from Niederrickenbach Station on the Luzern–Stans–Engelberg railway line, although there is a private road leading up to the village from Dallenwil.

History
Niederrickenbach has known a pilgrimage to Our Lady in the Maple since the 16th century, after a figurine of the Blessed Mother was placed in a maple tree on that site. Unable to remove the figurine, which came to be considered miraculous, a wayside shrine was erected with the figurine in it. Since 1565 a chapel for the pilgrims is attested. In 1688 it was replaced by a larger one and in 1869 the present chapel was consecrated. Noteworthy is its collection of Votive offerings.

In 1857, a small group of women who wanted to follow a monastic way of life founded the monastery. There they established the practice of Perpetual Adoration as a part of their life. The monastery is often associated with Engelberg Abbey, under the guidance of which they were established and later became formally incorporated into the Benedictine Order.

Sisters from this monastery founded the Benedictine Sisters of Perpetual Adoration in Nodaway County, Missouri, in the United States, who now have their motherhouse in Clyde, Missouri.

References

Further reading 
 Achermann, Hansjakob & Haller-Dirr, Marita: “Das Benediktinerinnen-Kloster Maria-Rickenbach in Geschichte und Gegenwart.” Historischer Verein Nidwalden, Stans, 2007,  (in German).

External links
Maria-Rickenbach official page (in German)
Article in English about biking the area

Christian monasteries established in the 16th century
19th-century Christian monasteries
Benedictine nunneries in Switzerland
Buildings and structures in Nidwalden
1528 establishments in the Holy Roman Empire
Religious organizations established in the 1520s
Tourist attractions in Nidwalden
Religious organizations established in 1857
19th-century Roman Catholic church buildings in Switzerland